The 1967 football season was São Paulo's 38th season since club's existence.

Overall
{|class="wikitable"
|-
|Games played || 52 (14 Torneio Roberto Gomes Pedrosa, 27 Campeonato Paulista, 11 Friendly match)
|-
|Games won || 25 (3 Torneio Roberto Gomes Pedrosa, 16 Campeonato Paulista, 6 Friendly match)
|-
|Games drawn || 20 (7 Torneio Roberto Gomes Pedrosa, 9 Campeonato Paulista, 4 Friendly match)
|-
|Games lost || 7 (4 Torneio Roberto Gomes Pedrosa, 2 Campeonato Paulista, 1 Friendly match)
|-
|Goals scored || 93
|-
|Goals conceded || 44
|-
|Goal difference || +49
|-
|Best result || 6–0 (H) v Botafogo - Campeonato Paulista - 1967.11.04
|-
|Worst result || 1–4 (A) v Racing - Friendly match - 1967.02.20
|-
|Most appearances || 
|-
|Top scorer || 
|-

Friendlies

Torneo Quadrangular de Temuco

Official competitions

Torneio Roberto Gomes Pedrosa

Record

Campeonato Paulista

Record

External links
official website 

Association football clubs 1967 season
1967
1967 in Brazilian football